Aphaenops bourdeaui is a species of beetle in the subfamily Trechinae. It was described by Coiffait in 1976.

References

bourdeaui
Beetles described in 1976